Blue Streak is a 1999 American buddy cop action comedy film directed by Les Mayfield. Inspired by the 1965 film The Big Job, the film stars Martin Lawrence, Luke Wilson, Dave Chappelle, Peter Greene, Nicole Ari Parker and William Forsythe. Lawrence plays Miles, a jewel thief who tries to retrieve a diamond he left at a police station, whereupon he disguises himself as a detective and gets paired with a real policeman to investigate burglaries. The film was shot on location in California. The prime shooting spot was Sony Pictures Studios, which is located in Culver City, California.

Blue Streak was released theatrically by Columbia Pictures on September 9, 1999 and opened as the number one movie in North America. Despite receiving mixed reviews from critics, it went on to gross nearly $120 million at the worldwide box office against a $36 million budget. The film's soundtrack album, featuring a number of popular urban/hip-hop artists, was certified platinum.

Plot
Jewel thief Miles Logan participates in a $17 million diamond heist in Los Angeles. He does this along with his crew of accomplices: his right hand and best friend Eddie, his getaway driver Tully, and Deacon, who is the newly acquired member of the group.  Deacon turns on them, killing Eddie by shooting him off of a tall building and causing him to fall onto a police car, before attempting to take the stone from Miles. As the police arrive, Miles hides the diamond in the ducts of a building under construction; as Deacon flees, Miles is arrested.

Upon his release from prison two years later, Miles attempts to reunite with his girlfriend.  She breaks it off for Miles  lying about being a criminal, which  prompts him to retrieve the diamond. Finding the building where he hid the diamond is now an LAPD police station, he goes inside, discovering the diamond is hidden in the ducts of what is now the Robbery/Homicide detective bureau, which requires a key card to access.

Miles returns disguised as a pizza deliveryman, steals an access card and visits his forger Uncle Lou. The fake badge and transfer papers allow Miles to enter the station, posing as newly-transferred police detective Malone. While trying to access the ducts, he inadvertently foils a prisoner escape and is teamed up with newly-appointed Detective Carlson.

What is supposed to be a quick in and out mission to retrieve the diamond ends up turning into a prolonged endeavor as Miles gets sent out on calls.  His knowledge on criminal activity and ability to foil crimes makes him quite popular among his "peers,” even getting promoted to detective in charge of the Robbery/Homicide division. He and Carlson are first sent on a burglary call, where Miles quickly solves it as fraud perpetrated by the owner. On the ride back, they stumble upon an armed robbery being committed by Tulley. Miles intervenes, arresting him before he's shot, but Tulley demands $50,000 to keep quiet about who Miles really is. He makes another attempt to locate the diamond, but is interrupted by Carlson, who has discovered Miles is not who he claims to be. Convincing Carlson that he is from Internal Affairs, Miles tries to get back to searching for the diamond, but they are sent out on another call. While out, they capture a truckload of heroin. Afterwards, Miles finds the diamond in the evidence locker and finally has it, but accidentally drops it into the load of heroin they seized. The FBI demands the heroin for testing.

A panicked Miles suggests the FBI and his cops unit use the heroin as bait in a sting. He arranges to be with the heroin in the delivery truck, but is soon joined by Tulley (whom he had set free from holding) and Deacon; during the drug deal, Deacon exposes Miles as a cop to the drug runners. While Miles and Tulley attempt to distract them, the police and FBI raid the deal. Deacon escapes with the diamond in an armored truck and the police and FBI follow as he approaches the border to Mexico. The police and FBI are forced to halt their pursuit at the border, but Miles steals a patrol car and chases Deacon. Miles forces him to wreck the truck and offers him a deal: Deacon gives Miles the diamond and allows him to arrest him in exchange for Miles taking him back to the US and cutting him back in on the diamond. He agrees, and Miles immediately double-crosses him by handcuffing him to the wrecked truck for the Federales and begins to walk back to the border. Deacon draws a gun to shoot him but Miles turns and shoots him dead, avenging the death of Eddie.

Miles walks back to the border where both the FBI and police demand explanations; he tells them he is an undercover Mexican officer and has to report back to his fellow Federales. A  few inches over the border, Carlson and Hardcastle stop him, revealing they know who he really is, but do not arrest him as they are grateful for all of his help and see him as a friend. They also say the FBI can't reach him over international borders, as he is a few inches over the border. After they share a bittersweet goodbye, Miles heads off to Mexico with the diamond.

Cast

Reception

Box office
The film opened at #1 with a weekend gross of $19,208,806 from 2,735 theaters for a per venue average of $7,023. It ended its run with $68,518,533 in North America, and $49,239,967 internationally for a total of $117,758,500 worldwide.

Critical reception
Blue Streak had received mostly mixed reviews. Rotten Tomatoes gives the film a 36% "Rotten" rating based on reviews from 69 critics and an average rating of 4.80/10. The critical consensus reads: "Martin Lawrence lends his comedic touch, but the movie isn't much more than standard action-comedy fare." On Metacritic, the film has a score of 46 out of 100 based on 26 reviews, indicating "mixed or average reviews". Audiences polled by CinemaScore gave the film an average grade of "A" on an A+ to F scale.

Gene Seymour of the Los Angeles Times described the film by saying that "it starts out like a caper flick that shifts, almost by accident, into an episode from the old Martin TV series [until] eventually, it settles for being a bleached, cluttered photostat of Beverly Hills Cop, if only a bit more clever than the original." Lawrence Van Gelder of The New York Times also compared the film to Beverly Hills Cop, and stated that "in this instance, the buoyancy is only intermittent."

Roger Ebert praised the film, giving it 3 stars out of 4 and writing: "Martin Lawrence is a comic actor with real talent, not always shown to best advantage. Bad Boys (1995), his cop buddy movie with Will Smith, was not a career high point, and it took a certain nerve to make another one. But Blue Streak works."

Cancelled sequel
There were plans for a sequel to Blue Streak, but the sequel did not materialize. Instead, its screenplay was reused for the film Bad Company.

Remakes 
The 2002 Hindi film Chor Machaaye Shor starring Bobby Deol was an unauthorized remake of Blue Streak. The storyline of the 2008 Indian Telugu language film Blade Babji, starring Allari Naresh and Sayali Bhagat was inspired by this film which was then remade in Tamil as Kasethan Kadavulada (2011) and in Kannada as Kiladi Kitty (2012).

See also
 The Big Job, a 1965 movie with a similar plot

References

External links
 
 
 

1999 films
1990s English-language films
1999 comedy films
1999 action comedy films
1990s buddy comedy films
1990s buddy cop films
1990s crime comedy films
1990s police comedy films
1990s heist films
American crime comedy films
American buddy comedy films
American buddy cop films
American heist films
American police detective films
African-American action comedy films
African-American comedy films
Original Film films
Columbia Pictures films
Films about the Federal Bureau of Investigation
Fictional portrayals of the Los Angeles Police Department
Films directed by Les Mayfield
Films produced by Neal H. Moritz
Films scored by Edward Shearmur
Films set in Los Angeles
Films shot in Los Angeles County, California
Films about con artists
1990s American films